The 1962–63 Eastern Professional Hockey League season was the fourth and final season of the Eastern Professional Hockey League, a North American minor professional league. Four teams participated in the regular season, and the Kingston Frontenacs were the league champions.

Regular season

Playoffs

External links
 Statistics on hockeydb.com

Eastern Professional Hockey League (1959–1963) seasons
EPHL
EPHL